"Hello, Goodbye" is a 1967 song by the English rock band The Beatles.

Hello Goodbye or Hello and Goodbye may also refer to:

Film and TV
 Hello-Goodbye (1970 film), a 1970 comedy film
Hello Goodbye (2008 film), a 2008 film starring Fanny Ardant and Gérard Depardieu
Hello Goodbye (TV series), a Dutch TV reality programme focussing on the passengers using Amsterdam Airport Schiphol
"Hello Goodbye" (Ugly Betty), the finale of the television series Ugly Betty 
"Hello, Goodbye" (Dark Angel), an episode of the television series Dark Angel

Music
hellogoodbye, American power-pop band
Hello Goodbye (band), Scandinavian indie-rock band

Albums
Hello Goodbye (David Tao album), 2013
Hello Goodbye (Shiori Niiyama album), 2015
 Hello & Goodbye, a 2007 album by the Christian pop group Jump5

Songs
"Hello Goodbye" (Tyler Farr song), a 2012 song by Tyler Farr
"Hello/Goodbye", a song by Blind Melon from Soup
 "Hello Goodbye", a song by Erik Segerstedt and Tone Damli

Books
Hello, Good-bye, a Japanese visual novel published in 2010 by Lump of Sugar

See also
Goodbye and Hello (disambiguation)
Hello and Goodbye (disambiguation)